Cybister fimbriolatus, the giant diving beetle, is a species of predaceous diving beetle in the family Dytiscidae. It is found in North America and the Neotropics.

Subspecies
These two subspecies belong to the species Cybister fimbriolatus:
 Cybister fimbriolatus crotchi Wilke, 1920
 Cybister fimbriolatus fimbriolatus (Say, 1825)

References

Further reading

External links

 

Dytiscidae
Articles created by Qbugbot
Beetles described in 1825